Piossasco is a comune (municipality) in the Metropolitan City  of Turin in the Italian region Piedmont, located about 20 km southwest of Turin at the foot of the Monte San Giorgio.

Piossasco borders the following municipalities: Trana, Rivalta di Torino, Sangano, Bruino, Cumiana, and Volvera.

Twin towns
 Cran-Gevrier, France, since 1991

References

External links
 Official website

Cities and towns in Piedmont